Hotea is a genus of shield-backed bugs belonging to the family Scutelleridae.

Species
 Hotea acuta Stål, 1865 
 Hotea circumcincta Walker, 1867 
 Hotea curculionoides (Herrich-Schäffer, 1836) 
 Hotea denticulata Stål, 1865 
 Hotea gambiae (Westwood, 1837) 
 Hotea nigrorufa Walker, 1867 
 Hotea redtenbacheri
 Hotea subfasciata (Westwood, 1837

Description
Male jewel bugs of the genus Hotea possess an unusually large, spiky, and heavily sclerotized genitalia. They are used in a mating practice known as traumatic insemination, a result of evolutionary sexual conflict. Male Hotea bugs tear through the female reproductive ducts to deposit sperm, inflicting substantial damage to the female in the process.

References

Scutelleridae